Stonelaw High School is a non-denominational state high school located in Rutherglen, Scotland near the city of Glasgow.

Admissions
Stonelaw High School is a leading Scottish school delivering the new National 4/5 qualifications introduced by the SQA. The current head teacher is Brenda McLachlan who took over from Brian Cooklin in 2012.

Stonelaw was awarded 'sports hub' status on 5 November 2013 by MSP Shona Robison Minister for Commonwealth Games and Sport. Outwith learning hours, the sports facilities are available for hire by the local community in partnership with South Lanarkshire Council, with several local clubs based there.

History

Stonelaw Public School on Melrose Avenue was built in 1886. It became Rutherglen Academy in 1926. A separate institution, Gallowflat Public School (named after the mansion house which stood nearby from the 1760s to the 1910s) was based on Hamilton Road from 1909.

Grammar school
Prior to 1970, a selective secondary education system existed in Scotland that involved two grades of secondary schools: Senior Secondaries and Junior Secondaries. At the heart of this selective system was an exam called the 11-Plus taken by all children in the last year of primary school. Those who passed the 11-Plus went to one of the Senior Secondaries (six-year schools) while all others attended one of the Junior Secondaries (four-year schools). Senior Secondary pupils were expected to stay on at school until aged eighteen and proceed to some sort of tertiary education at university or college, whereas Junior Secondary pupils had to leave school aged fifteen for jobs and/or apprenticeships. Before 1972, fifteen was the minimum school leaving age in Scotland.

Comprehensive
Stonelaw High School was established in August 1970 as a four-year school, merging some of the pupils already at Rutherglen Academy with pupils from Gallowflat Junior Secondary. Other Academy pupils who had been at primary schools in Cambuslang, Carmunnock and Burnside largely went up to the new (1970) Cathkin High School. Subsequently, Stonelaw pupils wishing to do Highers or Certificates of Sixth-Year Studies (CSYS) - these being pre-university qualifications - transferred to Cathkin High for their last two years.

The new Stonelaw school was based in the former Rutherglen Academy buildings at the corner of Stonelaw Road and Melrose Avenue along with an 'annex' – the Gallowflat Junior Secondary buildings on Hamilton Road The previous annex of Rutherglen Academy, the mid-19th century Macdonald School building in the heart of the town, closed at the same time – both arrangements involved hundreds of pupils walking through 400 yards of residential streets between the sites several times a day. Eventually Stonelaw High became a six-year school.

Relocation

The school relocated to new premises on Calderwood Road, Rutherglen in summer 1998, on land which had once been part of a farm. The playing fields, adjacent to the new site but finished in 1996 prior to the construction of the buildings, were previously the recreation grounds for the James Templeton & Co textile factory located at Glasgow Green which had also built some company houses in nearby streets.

The main Rutherglen Academy building, a Category B listed structure which survived a World War II bomb intended for nearby industrial sites, was redeveloped into 36 residential apartments in 2001, with the other buildings demolished and further modern flats constructed within the footprint, in a complex known as Academy Gate.

At the Gallowflat site, the main building (a replacement for the original which was destroyed by a fire in 1941) was used by Rutherglen High School, an additional educational needs facility, from 1999 until 2008 when they relocated to a new campus shared with the rebuilt Cathkin High School. The main building was soon replaced by a nursing home, David Walker Gardens, opened in 2011. The remaining east block at Gallowflat (the home economics department, its age reflected in its 'Girls' carving above the door – the demolished 'Boys' block further west housed the technical subjects) is also Category B listed but has lain empty and disused since the 1998 move, although plans to convert it into residences were approved in 2015.

Feeder Schools
The primary schools whose pupils progress to Stonelaw include Bankhead, Burgh, Burnside, Calderwood and Spittal located within Rutherglen, James Aiton in Cambuslang and Park View in Halfway.

By contrast, Calderwood Primary is immediately adjacent to the Stonelaw buildings.

Extracurricular activities
The school has many extra curricular activities and clubs including football, volleyball, a table tennis club, a cricket club and a soul band. They also have a band with full brass, woodwind and percussion sections. The music department also hosts a choir, brass ensemble and a recently started Samba band.

Notable alumni

Stonelaw High School (1970–)
 Ray Deans, footballer
 Simon Donnelly, footballer 
 Jayd Johnson, actress
 Scott Kyle, actor
 Suzie McAdam, stage actress
 Stevan McAleer, racing driver
 William McLachlan, footballer
Jonathan Saunders, fashion designer
 Richard Rankin, actor
 Steven Saunders, footballer
 Scott Stewart, footballer
 Alan Trouten, footballer
 Gary Erskine, artist
 Audrey Tait, musician

Rutherglen Academy (1926–1970)
 Archie Baird, footballer (Aberdeen etc.) 
 Sir Denis William Brogan, historian, Professor of Political Science from 1939 to 1968 at the University of Cambridge, father of Hugh Brogan
 Janet Brown, female impressionist
 Andy Cameron, comedian
 Steven Campbell (artist)
 Duncan Glen, poet
 Niall Hopper, footballer
 Adam Little, footballer
 Mamie Magnusson, journalist
 Donny McLean, footballer
 Jim McColl OBE, entrepreneur and "Scotland's richest man" (£800 million in 2008) 
 Prof Edwin Morgan OBE, Titular Professor of English from 1975 to 1980 at the University of Glasgow, and National Poet for Scotland from 2004 to 2010
 Alexander Pollock, Conservative MP for Moray and Nairn / Moray from 1979 to 1987
 Dr John Rae, Chief Executive of the Atomic Weapons Establishment (AWE plc) from 2000 to 2001, and Chief Scientist at the Department of Energy from 1986 to 1989
 Sir Adam Thomson CBE, founder of Caledonian Airways (Managing Director from 1964 to 1970 and Chief Executive from 1970 to 1988)
 Midge Ure, musician
 Robert Wilson MBE, music industry entrepreneur

Stonelaw Public School (1886–1926)
 Alec Bennett, footballer
 Stan Laurel, actor, writer and comedian ("Laurel and Hardy")

Notable former teachers
 Norman Buchan, Labour MP from 1983 to 1990 for Paisley South
 Bill Butler, politician
 Jonathan Page, footballer
 Alistair MacLean, Scottish novelist, taught at Gallowflat School
 Harry Johnston (PE teacher), footballer with Montrose and Partick Thistle and cricketer for Scotland
Jim Holmes, janitor, footballer with Greenock Morton

References

External links

profile on ParentZone at Education Scotland
 The Case for Stonelaw, 1989 video on proposals to move the school to Toryglen
 Official video from old Stonelaw High, 1998 (Part 1) 
 Official video from old Stonelaw High, 1998 (Part 2)

Secondary schools in South Lanarkshire
Buildings and structures in Rutherglen
Cambuslang
Former school buildings in the United Kingdom
Educational institutions established in 1970
1970 establishments in Scotland
School buildings completed in 1998